Yuryshki is a rural locality (a village) in Saryevskoye Rural Settlement, Vyaznikovsky District, Vladimir Oblast, Russia. The population was 24 as of 2010.

Geography 
Yuryshki is located on the Tara River, 37 km northwest of Vyazniki (the district's administrative centre) by road. Osinki is the nearest rural locality.

References 

Rural localities in Vyaznikovsky District